The Intertec SuperBrain was an all-in-one commercial microcomputer that was first sold by Intertec Data Systems Corp. of Columbia, South Carolina, USA in 1979. The machine ran the operating system CP/M and was somewhat unusual in that it used dual Z80 CPUs, the second being used as a disk controller.

There were several variants, including the SuperBrain II (released in 1982), SuperBrain II Jr., "QD" (quad density disk drives) and "SD" (super density) models.

Intertec also released a similar looking dumb terminal, the Intertube, and smart terminal, the Emulator.

The SuperBrain is notable for being at the user end of the first Kermit connection in 1981.

The machine was practical and useful in the office environment, but somewhat limited until the arrival of the first 5 MB hard drive in one of the floppy drive bays.  This was soon replaced by the 10 MB hard drive.

Up to 255 CompuStar workstations could be daisy-chained together via DC-37 "Chaining Adaptor" parallel ports to share the "central disk system" (one of the three hard drive peripheral options below). Each computer, or VPU (Video Processing Unit), was assigned a unique number from 1 to 255 by setting an eight-position DIP switch.

Specifications

Peripherals

 CompuStar DSS-10 10 MB Hard Drive (CompuStar Disk Storage System)
 CDC 96 MB Hard Drive (80 MB fixed disk with 16 MB removable platter)
 Priam 14" 144 MB Hard Drive

Applications
 Microsoft BASIC
 8080 Assembler
 Microsoft COBOL 74
 APL

In pop culture
The Superbrain can be seen in two episodes of Knight Rider: one in Season 1, Episode 10, "The Final Verdict" (1982), and the second in Season 1, Episode 18, "White Bird" (1983).

In John Carpenter’s The Thing, Dr. Blair uses a Superbrain to analyse samples from The Thing from which he estimates that it will take over the world in about three years.

References

External links
Intertec SuperBrain  DAVES OLD COMPUTERS
Superbrain at Old Computer Museum
Marcus Bennett's Superbrain documentation

CP/M
Microcomputers
Computer-related introductions in 1979